The Ville-class harbour tugboats are a class of tugboats employed by the Royal Canadian Navy.

Canada operated a fleet of 17-ton tugs, built during the Second World War which were also called the Ville class. The current vessels are named after those vessels. There is confusion that the current Ville-class design was based on the British Pup-class tugs. The original 17-ton version was based on that design, however the new Villes are an independent design.

Design
The Ville class were designed by the Canadian naval architecture company Robert Allan Ltd as harbour tugs. They have a low-slung shape that is ideal for tight maneuvering and nudging exercises on larger ships.

Propulsion

Towing
The Ville class has a max bollard pull of 7.5 tons, denoting them as small tugboats. The bollard pull measures the amount of pulling or pushing power a ship has.

Ships

Other auxiliary ships
The Royal Canadian Navy operates five other, larger tugboats, the 140-ton , and five 250-ton  tugs, and one 140-ton s. The larger tugs are also split between both coasts.

On 29 April 2019 the Government of Canada announced Ocean Industries of Isle-aux-Coudres, Quebec was awarded the contract to build four tow-tug/rescue vessels to replace both the Fire-class fireboats and Glen-class tugs with delivery expected from 2021 to 2023. The new tugs will be staffed by civilian crews and be restricted to the naval base/yard only.

References

Harbor vessels of Canada
Auxiliary ships of the Royal Canadian Navy
Tugboats of the Royal Canadian Navy

Auxiliary tugboat classes